Goliathus albosignatus is a species of beetle of the family Scarabaeidae, described by Boheman in 1857. It is one of several species of Goliath beetles that inhabit Africa, but it is the only one exclusively found in subtropical sections of the continent.

Description
Goliathus albosignatus can reach a length of about 45–70 mm (1.8–2.8 in) in males, of about 40–50 mm (1.6–2.0 in) in females. There are distinctive nonuniform bands of black that stretch horizontally across their elytra and differentiate it from other species. While Goliath beetles are among the largest beetles on Earth, this is the smallest of the species in this genus and not as commonly found as the others. Sexually dimorphic traits are also present in Goliath beetles and include males having a Y shaped horn protruding from their head to assist with confrontation between males, while in females the horn is absent and their wedge-shaped head is fit for digging the burrows where eggs are to be laid.

Biology 
Development of Goliathus albosignatus is carried out in Hyrax dung which is a trait shared with Fornasinius species, but not among any other Goliath beetles. Their diet consists of high protein as larvae, but after pupating into adulthood, they have been known to feed on sap from Acacia. Other behaviour of note is they will gather specifically on marula trees.

Taxonomy 
Goliathus albosignatus is taxonomically separated from the other species in Goliathus according to barcoding analysis results that were published in Entomologia Africana in January 2020. Characteristics differentiating Goliathus albosignatus that are mentioned include "hammer-shaped post-clypeal horns of the male, the elongated tarsi, and the presence of cretaceous marks on the pygidium". The tree resulting from the analysis is listed below:

Subspecies
There are 2 subspecies:

 Goliathus albosignatus albosignatus   Boheman 1857
 Goliathus albosignatus kirkianus   Gray, 1864

Subspecies distributions and sizes
 Goliathus albosignatus albosignatus:

Distribution: Middle to South Zimbabwe and North-Eastern South Africa; Size: ♂ 40 – 68 mm; ♀ 45 – 52 mm.

Goliathus albosignatus kirkianus:

Distribution: Malawi, Mozambique and Tanzania; Size: ♂ 40 – 71 mm; ♀ 45 – 55 mm.

References

Cetoniinae
Beetles described in 1857